Pholas is a taxonomic genus of marine bivalve molluscs in the subfamily Pholadinae  of the family Pholadidae. 

Like other members of this family, they have an ability to bore through clay, earth, wood and soft rock.

Subgenera
 Pholas (Monothyra) Tryon, 1862
 Pholas (Pholas) Linnaeus, 1758
 Pholas (Thovana) Leach Gray, 1847

Species
 Pholas bissauensis Cosel & Haga, 2018
 Pholas campechiensis Gmelin, 1791
 Pholas chiloensis Molina, 1782
 Pholas dactylus Linnaeus, 1758
 Pholas orientalis Gmelin, 1791

Synonyms
 Pholas silicula Lamarck, 1818: synonym of Barnea candida (Linnaeus, 1758)

References

 Coan, E. V.; Valentich-Scott, P. (2012). Bivalve seashells of tropical West America. Marine bivalve mollusks from Baja California to northern Peru. 2 vols, 1258 pp.

External links
 Linnaeus, C. (1758). Systema Naturae per regna tria naturae, secundum classes, ordines, genera, species, cum characteribus, differentiis, synonymis, locis. Editio decima, reformata [10th revised edition, vol. 1: 824 pp. Laurentius Salvius: Holmiae]
 Poli J.X. (1791). Testacea utriusque Siciliae eorumque historia et anatome tabulis aeneis illustrata. Ex Regio Typographeio, Parmae. Vol. 1: pp. i-lxxiii
 Gofas, S.; Le Renard, J.; Bouchet, P. (2001). Mollusca. in: Costello, M.J. et al. (eds), European Register of Marine Species: a check-list of the marine species in Europe and a bibliography of guides to their identification. Patrimoines Naturels. 50: 180-213

Pholadidae
Bivalve genera